The Diocese of Cheyenne is a Latin Church ecclesiastical territory, or diocese, of the Catholic Church in the US state of Wyoming. It is a suffragan diocese in the ecclesiastical province of the metropolitan Archdiocese of Denver.
 
The cathedral and mother church for the Diocese of Cheyenne is St. Mary's Cathedral, located in Cheyenne, Wyoming. The diocese covers all of Wyoming, as well as the parts of Yellowstone National Park in Montana and Idaho.

History

1800 to 1887
As part of the Louisiana Purchase in 1803, the Wyoming area was theoretically under the ecclesiastical jurisdiction of the Bishop of Louisiana and the Two Floridas in New Orleans. In 1827, it was placed under the bishop of the Dioceses of St. Louis. On July 5, 1840, Jesuit missionary Pierre-Jean De Smet offered the first mass in the Wyoming area, east of the present day town of Daniel. A monument to the event was later erected on this site. Lake De Smet is named after him.

In 1851, John Miège was installed in a ceremony in St. Louis as vicar apostolic for the Indian Territory east of the Rocky Mountains. The vicariate included the present states of Kansas, Nebraska, Oklahoma, the parts of North and South Dakota west of the Missouri River, Wyoming, Montana, and a part of Colorado.  

On January 6, 1857 Pope Pius IX established the Apostolic Vicariate of Nebraska from the Apostolic Vicariate of Indian Territory. In 1859, Pius IX named James O'Gorman, prior of New Melleray Abbey, near Dubuque, Iowa, as the vicar apostolic. In 1867, O'Gorman assigned Reverend William Kelly as the first resident priest of Cheyenne. Kelly's responsibilities included visiting the railroad camps west of the town. Reverend Eugene Cusson was the first resident priest assigned to Laramie. In 1875, Cusson persuaded the Sisters of Charity of Leavenworth to come to Laramie, where they opened a hospital in a house donated by the Union Pacific Railroad. In 1884, the Jesuits established St. Stephens Mission on the Wind River Indian Reservation in Wyoming.

The Apostolic Vicariate of Nebraska was elevated to the Diocese of Omaha by Pope Leo XIII on October 2, 1885. At the time, the diocese included all of Nebraska and Wyoming.

1887 to 1900 
On August 2, 1887, Pope Leo XIII erected the Diocese of Cheyenne, removing its territory from the Diocese of Omaha. He appointed Reverend Maurice Burke of the Archdiocese of Chicago as the first bishop of Cheyenne.

By 1889, the diocese had five priests and 5,000 parishioners spread over a huge area. Burke faced attacks by the American Protective Association, an anti-Catholic and anti-Irish hate group.  The virulence forced the Sisters of Charity to abandon their institutions in the diocese.  Burke traveled to Rome to petition the Vatican to attach the diocese to a more established one, citing the dire conditions in Wyoming.  The pope denied his request.  In a letter to Katherine Drexel, Burke described himself as a "bishop in name only" without parishioners or priests. In 1893, Pope Leo XIII attached the Diocese of Cheyenne to the Archdiocese of Dubuque, and transferred Burke to the Diocese of Saint Joseph. The Diocese of Cheyenne was without a bishop for the next three years.

On December 18, 1896, Reverend Thomas Lenihan of the Archdiocese of Dubuque was named the second bishop of the Diocese of Cheyenne by Leo XIII. When Lenihan arrived in Cheyenne in 1897, the diocese contained eight priests, nine churches, and one parochial school for 3,000 Catholics. By the time of his death three years later, there were 6,000 Catholics, 26 churches, 15 priests, and four parochial schools. Lenihan died in 1901

1900 to 1950 
On June 10, 1902 Pope Leo XIII appointed Reverend James Keane from the Archdiocese of St. Paul as the third bishop of Cheyenne. Keane came to Wyoming at a time of increasing population and economic expansion.  Keane successfully recruited priests to serve in the diocese.  The diocese was incorporated according to Wyoming law. The diocesan parishes were also incorporated, with the bishop, the pastor and two lay trustees serving as a corporate board for each parish.  

Keane was successful in his appeals to the newly formed Catholic Church Extension Society for funds to expand the church across the state.  He also directed the building of Cheyenne's St. Mary's Cathedral and a new episcopal residence.  The cathedral was dedicated in 1909.  He served as  bishop for nine years in Cheyenne before being named archbishop of the Archdiocese of Dubuque in 1911.

On January 19, 1912, Reverend Patrick McGovern from the Diocese of Omaha was appointed the fourth bishop of Cheyenne, by Pope Pius X. On August 2, 1947, Reverend Hubert Newell of the Archdiocese of Denver was appointed as coadjutor bishop of the Diocese of Cheyenne to assist McGovern by Pope Pius XII.

1950 to present 
In 1951, after 39 years as bishop, McGovern died and Newell automatically succeeded him as bishop. Newell established the diocesan newspaper, The Wyoming Catholic Register, in 1952, citing the need to communicate with parishioners. Also in 1952, he dedicated the new DePaul Hospital in Cheyenne. As part of a national initiative to involve women more in Catholic activities, Newell set up a Council of Catholic Women in Cheyenne.  It was followed by other councils in Wyoming communities and by the Wyoming Council of Catholic Women in 1953. It was accredited by the National Council of Catholic Women that same year. Newell resigned in 1978.

On April 25, 1978, Pope Paul VI named Auxiliary Bishop Joseph Hart as the sixth bishop of Cheyenne.During his tenure as bishop, Hart established the annual Bishop's Appeal and ordained 25 priests for the diocese.On December 14, 1999, Reverend David L. Ricken was appointed as coadjutor bishop of the diocese by Pope John Paul II. Hart resigned in 2001 and Ricken automatically succeeded him as bishop of Cheyenne.

While bishop of Cheyenne, Ricken co-founded Wyoming Catholic College in Lander, Wyoming, established the Wyoming School of Catholic Thought at Wyoming Catholic College, and founded the John Paul II Catholic School in Gillette, Wyoming. Ricken oversaw the building of a new building for St. Mary's Catholic School in Cheyenne. In 2008, Pope Benedict XVI named Ricken as bishop of the Diocese of Green Bay.

On October 19, 2009,  Benedict XVI appointed Reverend Paul D. Etienne of the Archdiocese of Indianapolis as bishop of the Diocese of Cheyenne .Etienne was appointed archbishop of the Archdiocese of Anchorage by Pope Francis in 2016.  His replacement in Cheyenne was Reverend Steven Biegler of the Diocese of Rapid City, named by Francis in 2017. Biegler is the current bishop of Cheyenne.

Sex abuse 
In 2002, Bishop Hart was accused of repeatedly coercing a 14-year-old boy to expose himself in 1977, when Hart was auxiliary bishop in Cheyenne. Hart was cleared of those charges in July 2002. However, it was later determined that the original investigation was flawed;  it was re-opened and more accusers came forward. Bishop Ricken was also implicated for his role in defending, and possibly also protecting, Hart during this criminal investigation.

In 2004, Hart was named in a civil lawsuit alleging that he sexually abused three children while serving in Kansas City and Cheyenne. In 2005, a fifth person alleged abuse by Hart in 1973 or 1974, when the man was a 12-year-old parishioner at St. John Francis Regis Parish. In August 2008, the Diocese of Kansas City-St. Joseph approved a $10 million settlement to a group of 47 victims who cited Hart among 12 other clergymen responsible for their abuse.In 2010, Bishop Etienne requested an investigation by the Vatican into sexual abuse allegations by 11 men against Hart.  Etienne suspended Hart from performing masses in 2015.

In 2017, Bishop Biegler announced an investigation of Hart.  In April 2018, the Cheyenne Police Department started a criminal investigation into Hart. In August 2019, the police recommended that criminal charges be filed against Hart. Four more people from Wyoming and Missouri also accused Hart of sexually abusing them as well, bringing the total of sex abuse allegations against Hart to more than a dozen. It was also revealed that in June 2019 Pope Francis started a canonical penal process against Hart. On August 28, 2019, it was announced that a house owned by Monsignor Thomas O’Brien on Lake Viking in Missouri was used by Hart and O'Brien to allegedly abuse children sexually, with O'Brien's sister allegedly assisting in the cover-ups.

The diocese investigation concluded in July 2018, declaring that two victims were credible and their stories substantiated. However, in June 2020, the Natrona County District Attorney’s Office declined to press charges against Hart.  Believing that the case was prosecutable, the Cheyanne police submitted it to the Wyoming Attorney General. On January 21, 2021, the Congregation for the Doctrine of the Faith in the Vatican cleared Hart of seven sexual abuse charges and stated that five other charges could not be proven.  After the Congregation's decision, Biegler stated that he believed the victims. However, the Congregation rebuked Hart;...for his flagrant lack of prudence as a priest and bishop for being alone with minors in his private residence and on various trips, which could have been potential occasions endangering the ‘obligation to observe continence’ and that would ‘give rise to scandal among the faithful,'The original list of "credibly accused clergy" included 30 victims, 29 of whom were male and female minors, with more victims coming out in August 2019 as well. Ricken, who wrote a letter defending Hart, also came under scrutiny for possibly obstructing a 2002 criminal investigation against Hart.

Statistics 
As of 2014, the Diocese of Cheyenne served 54,995 Catholics (9.5% of 576,412 total) on 252,552 km² in 37 parishes.  The diocese had 64 priests (61 diocesan, three religious), 37 deacons, 17 lay religious (three brothers, 14 sisters) and ten seminarians.

Bishops

Bishops of Cheyenne
 Maurice Francis Burke (1887-1893), appointed Bishop of Saint Joseph
 Thomas Mathias Lenihan (1896-1901)
 James Keane (1902-1911), appointed Archbishop of Dubuque
 Patrick McGovern (1912-1951)
 Hubert Newell (1951-1978)
 Joseph Hubert Hart (1978-2001)
 David L. Ricken (2001-2008; coadjutor bishop 2000-2001), appointed Bishop of Green Bay
 Paul D. Etienne (2009-2016), appointed Archbishop of Anchorage 
 Steven Biegler (2017–present)

Former Auxiliary Bishops of Cheyenne
 Joseph Hubert Hart (1976-1978), appointed Bishop of Cheyenne

See also 
 List of Catholic dioceses in the United States
 Roman Catholicism in the United States
 Catholic Church and politics in the United States
 History of Roman Catholicism in the United States

References

Sources and external links 
 Roman Catholic Diocese of Cheyenne Official Site 
 GCatholic, with Google map and photo - data for all sections
 Father Steven Biegler selected as ninth bishop of Diocese of Cheyenne

 
Roman Catholic Ecclesiastical Province of Denver
Roman Catholic Diocese
Roman Catholic dioceses and prelatures established in the 19th century
Roman Catholic dioceses in the United States
Roman Catholic Diocese of Cheyenne
Roman Catholic Diocese